Rudofsky is a surname. Notable people with the surname include:

 Lee Rudofsky (born 1979), American judge
 Bernard Rudofsky (1905–1988), Austrian-American writer, architect, collector, teacher, designer, and social historian